

Actions

American Civil War
1864, February 17 – Confederate human-powered submarine H. L. Hunley sinks the Union sloop  with spar torpedo, off Charleston. The H. L. Hunley thus became the first submarine to successfully sink an enemy vessel in combat, and was the direct progenitor of what would eventually become international submarine warfare.

First Balkan War
1912, December 9 –  became the first submarine to launch a self-propelled torpedo at an enemy ship, though the ship did not sink due to a weapons malfunction.

World War I

1914, October 18 – German submarine  sinks  in the first ever successful attack on one submarine by another.
1914, October 20 – German submarine  sinks  in the first submarine sinking of a merchant ship during the world wars.
1915, May 7 – German submarine  sinks  killing 1,198 and leaving 761 survivors.  The sinking turned public opinion in many countries against Germany, contributed to the U.S. entry into World War I.
Two days after the same U-boat sunk the pre-dreadnought HMS Triumph near Gaba Nepe.
1916, March 22 – German submarine  is sunk by the Q-ship – a merchant ship carrying hidden weapons – HMS Farnborough in the first successful use of depth charges. (Farnborough sank the SM U-83 in 1917)

World War II

1939, September 17 - German U-boat  sinks HMS Courageous.
1939, October 14 – German U-boat  sinks HMS Royal Oak in Scapa Flow base. The First Lord of Admiralty Winston Churchill officially announced the loss of Royal Oak to the House of Commons, first conceding that the raid had been "a remarkable exploit of professional skill and daring".
1940, October 17–19 – The most effective wolfpack of the world wars including Kretschmer, Prien and Schepke sinks 32 ships from Convoy SC 7 and Convoy HX 79 in two days.
1940, November 23 –  sinks 7 Allied Merchant ships from Convoy SC-11 in only 3 hours.
1941, November 13 – U-81 strikes  with a single torpedo. She sinks the following day due to crippling damage.
1941, November 28 - Dutch submarine HNLMS O-21 becomes the only submarine to sink another submarine while they were both surfaced when she sinks German submarine U-95 with a stern torpedo.
1942, June 7 - The I-168 sinks the US aircraft carrier USS Yorktown (CV-5) and the USS Hammonn (DD-214) who was attempting to save the Yorktown from battle damage she had received in the Battle of Midway.
1942, September 15 – Japanese submarine I-19 sinks U.S. aircraft carrier  and destroyer  and damages battleship  with a single salvo.
1942, November 13 - I-26 sinks USS Juneau. The dead includes all five Sullivan brothers.
1943, March 16–19 – The largest North Atlantic U-boat wolfpack attack of the world wars sinks 22 ships from Convoys HX 229/SC 122.
1943, April 29 – May 6 – Convoy ONS 5 is the last major North Atlantic wolfpack attack by surfaced U-boats as escorts demonstrate effective use of radar to sink 6 U-boats in low-visibility conditions.
1944, November 29 – USS Archer-Fish sinks Japanese aircraft carrier Shinano, the largest vessel of that time.
1943, October 31-November 1 – USS Borie and U-405 engage in a pitched battle ending with Borie ramming the submarine. Both ships are lost.
1945, January 30 – Soviet submarine S-13 sinks the German ship Wilhelm Gustloff, with older and cautious estimates of 6,000 but more recent estimates of more than 9,000 casualties.
1945, April 16 – Soviet submarine L-3 sinks the German ship Goya, with 6,000–7,000 casualties.
1945, July 30 - USS Indianapolis is sunk by the Japanese submarine I-58. She suffers the largest loss of life of an American ship.

Post-World War II
1971, December 9 – Pakistani  PNS Hangor during the 1971 Indo-Pakistani War sinks the Indian frigate . This was the first ship sunk by a submarine since World War II. Hangor also damaged another warship, INS Kirpan. This was the heaviest casualty that the Pakistani Navy inflicted on the Indian Navy in the war. After the attack on Khukri, the Indian Navy ceased its attacks on Karachi and moved the focus of its operations to East Pakistan ports like Chittagong and Cox's Bazar.
1982, May 2 – British nuclear submarine HMS Conqueror sinks Argentine cruiser General Belgrano off the Falkland Islands. It was the first sinking of any vessel by a nuclear-powered submarine in wartime and also the first time that a nuclear-powered submarine fired weapons in an act of war.
2010, March 26 – A North Korean 2-men midget submarine sinks the South Korean corvette ROKS Cheonan off Baengnyeong Island.

See also

List of single ship actions

References

Submarine warfare
Naval warfare
Naval lists
Lists of naval battles